Doe Hill railway station served the village of Stonebroom, Derbyshire, England, from 1862 to 1960 on the Erewash Valley Line.

History 
The station was opened on 1 May 1862 by the Midland Railway. It closed on 12 September 1960. The station building still survives.

References 

Disused railway stations in Derbyshire
Former Midland Railway stations
Railway stations in Great Britain opened in 1862
Railway stations in Great Britain closed in 1960
1862 establishments in England
1962 disestablishments in England